National Route 35 is a national highway in South Korea connects Buk District to Gangneung. It established on 14 March 1981.

Main stopovers

Busan
 Buk District
South Gyeongsang Province
 Yangsan City
Ulsan
 Ulju County
North Gyeongsang Province
 Gyeongju City - Yeongcheon City - Cheongsong County - Andong City - Bonghwa County
Gangwon Province
 Taebaek City - Samcheok City - Jeongseon County - Gangneung City

Major intersections

 (■): Expressway
IS: Intersection, IC: Interchange

Busan

South Gyeongsang Province

Ulsan

North Gyeongsang Province 

  Expressway

Gangwon Province

References

35
Roads in Busan
Roads in South Gyeongsang
Roads in Ulsan
Roads in North Gyeongsang
Roads in Gangwon